Conversation Piece is a box set by English musician David Bowie, released in November 2019, which contains five CDs featuring recordings made in 1968–1969. The box set includes home demos and BBC sessions, as well as two mixes of the 1969 album Space Oddity: the original 1969 stereo mix, and a new 2019 mix produced by Tony Visconti specifically for the set. The release of the 1969 mix is a repressing of the 2009 remastered CD, which was chosen due to its being mastered to match the original LP release, a priority that was not taken for Parlophone's in-house remaster created for the Five Years (1969–1973) box set in 2015.

Most of the demo tracks had been released earlier in 2019 in the vinyl box sets Spying Through a Keyhole, Clareville Grove Demos, and The 'Mercury' Demos. The 2019 mix of Space Oddity was also given a standalone release on CD and LP and on digital download and streaming services, concurrently with the box set.

Recording dates 
The first 11 tracks were likely recorded between January and March 1968, the same time "In The Heat of The Morning" and "London Bye, Ta-Ta" were recorded professionally. Tracks 12 and 13 were also likely recorded in November 1968, shortly after the writing of the song "Space Oddity". Track 14 was recorded sometime between November 1968 and tracks 15 to 23, recorded in January 1969.

The Mercury Demos CD was recorded sometime between the first studio attempt at Space Oddity on 2 February 1969, and David's move to Beckenham in mid April.

Tracks 1–2 of the third disc were recorded between the 12 March and the 18 April 1968 at Decca Studios, with tracks 3–7 being recorded on 13 May at BBC Radio Studios. Following this is "Ching A Ling", track 8, which was recorded in two sessions between 24 October and 27 November 1968. Track 9 was recorded 2 February 1969, at Morgan Studios. Track 10 was recorded 20 June 1969, with Track 11 likely being recorded around the same time, and Track 12 being from around July – September. Track 14–16 were recorded 20 October.

Track listing

Charts

References

David Bowie compilation albums
2019 compilation albums
Parlophone compilation albums